Indonesia Raya is the national anthem of Indonesia. The term Indonesia Raya can also refer to one of the following:
Greater Indonesia, a political concept known as Indonesia Raya in Indonesian
Indonesia Raya (newspaper), a defunct Indonesian newspaper